Joseph Sykes Brothers Company Building is a historic factory building located at Charlotte, Mecklenburg County, North Carolina. It was designed by Lockwood, Greene & Co. and built in 1926.  It is a one-story building that consists of a small office section in the front and a large machine shop to the rear.  The building has a brick veneer, steel sash windows, and restrained Classical Revival detailing ornamenting the facade and side.  It has undergone a certified rehabilitation.  It was built as the Charlotte facility of the Joseph Sykes Brothers Company, an international producer of card clothing, machinery used in cotton production.

It was added to the National Register of Historic Places in 2003.

References

Industrial buildings and structures on the National Register of Historic Places in North Carolina
Neoclassical architecture in North Carolina
Industrial buildings completed in 1926
Buildings and structures in Charlotte, North Carolina
National Register of Historic Places in Mecklenburg County, North Carolina